The county of Nares is a cadastral division of Queensland which contains the city of Cairns, Innisfail and most of the Atherton Tableland. The county is divided into civil  parishes. Cairns is mentioned as being in the county of Nares in the 1911 Britannica. It is bounded by the Daintree River in the north.

Parishes
Nares is subdivided into parishes, listed as follows:

References

External links 
  
 

Nares